Chalappalem is a village in Santhanuthala padu Mandal, Prakasam district, Andhra Pradesh, India.

References

Villages in Prakasam district